Carl Krull (born 1975) is a contemporary Danish artist. Best known for his "seismic" approach to sculptural drawing and painting, Krull works in various media, including sculptural drawing (paper and ink/pencil), sculpture, printmaking, virtual reality, and digital media.

An alumnus of the Jan Matejko Academy of Fine Arts (Poland) and San Carlos Academy of Fine Arts (Mexico), he completed a Master of Fine Arts degree in 1999.
Krull has shown work in solo and group gallery exhibitions, including Snapshots From Slumberland – 3 X KRULL (ARoS Aarhus Kunstmuseum, Aarhus), Resonance (Hans Alf Gallery, Copenhagen), Seismic (V1 Gallery, Copenhagen), Copenhagen Creatives (Maison du Danemark, Paris), and Corpus Unika (Royal Danish Theatre, Copenhagen). He created commissioned sculptures for public installations at  sculpture park (Silkeborg) and Elsinore, murals, the design selected for the Carlsberg's 2018 Wiibroe Design, and was the inspiration for the Theatrical Organization of Cyprus theatre production In Two Minds. Until 2019, Krull's studio was at Holckenhus, in the historical corner pavilion loft unit where artists Emil Nolde and Agnes Slott-Møller lived and worked.

Biography
Krull studied at the Jan Matejko Academy of Fine Arts (Poland) and San Carlos Academy of Fine Arts, graduating with a Master of Fine Arts degree in 1999. He was selected as a 2007 Artist-in-residence at Art Studio Itsukaichi (Japan).

Career
Carl Krull's artistic style has been described as "seismic" or "seismographic", referring to the sculptural drawing and painting approach that he developed. The approach is characterized by a topographical way of perceiving figures and space; rather than using contours to outline his subjects, Krull employs an abundance of lines to create the effect of the subject protruding from the two-dimensional surface of the paper or screen. Krull developed the method during a road trip through the United States, drawing continuous lines on a paper tube while acting as a human seismograph, allowing bumps in the road to create irregularities in the contoured lines he was drawing. Through experimentation, he evolved the method from black and white car scrolls to color, and incorporated diverse methods that include photography, drawing, painting, printmaking, large scale sculptures, and murals.

Public installations

 Celestial – 2018, Elsinore harbor.
 Subterranean – 2017, Silkeborg Bad sculpture park. The resulting sculptures were lifted from the earthen mold to create a single convex figure.
 Loloopop – 2006. An audio-visual installation created in collaboration with Simon Steen-Andersen.

Public collections
 Slitscanner (pencil), acquired 2011, ARoS Aarhus Kunstmuseum
 Slitscanner  (digital media), acquired 2011, ARoS Aarhus Kunstmuseum
 Graphite #5 (pencil on paper), acquired 2016, Colección SOLO (Madrid, Spain)
 Olmec #2 (pencil on paper), acquired 2016, Colección SOLO (Madrid, Spain)
 Olmec #4 (pencil on paper), acquired 2016, Colección SOLO (Madrid, Spain)
 Olmec #5 (pencil on paper), acquired 2016, Colección SOLO (Madrid, Spain)

Selected exhibitions
 Resonance, Hans Alf Gallery (solo) (Copenhagen, Denmark) – 2018
 Copenhagen Creatives (participating artist), Maison du Danemark (Paris, France) – 2018
 Wunderkammer 1 – liquid form (participating artist), Esbjerg Art Museum (Jutland, Denmark) – 2018
 Seismic, V1 Gallery (Copenhagen, Denmark) – 2014
 Snapshots from Slumberland – 3 x Krulls, ARoS Aarhus Kunstmuseum (Aarhus, Denmark) – 2011
 Telescope, V1 Gallery (Copenhagen, Denmark) – 2010
 Palace Party (participating artist), Kunsthal Charlottenborg (Copenhagen, Denmark) – 2011

Performing arts

Krull performed live in the production Body and Soul (Royal Danish Theatre, 2015–2016 season), creating a piece of virtual reality art during this theatre tribute to the human body. 
During the exhibition Palace Party at Kunsthal Charlottenborg, Krull performed a live, artistic marathon in front of the audience, creating a large-scale drawing over the course of 10 hours. His work served as the inspiration for the 2010 Theatrical Organization of Cyprus theatre production In Two Minds.

Awards
 "Selected Artist" invited to create the 2018 Carlsberg Wiibroe Design (graphic design)
 Seismic Wave (outdoor installation) – Finalist, Hegnspælen 2015
 Angels and Demons – Diesel New Art Prize 2005

References

External links
 
 Subterranean – sculpture at Silkeborg Bad Art Center

1975 births
Living people
Danish contemporary artists
21st-century Danish artists